Zolotoy Klyuch is a rural locality (a settlement) in Pribaykalsky District, Republic of Buryatia, Russia. The population was 95 as of 2010. There are 3 streets.

Geography 
Zolotoy Klyuch is located by the Turka River, 157 km northeast of Turuntayevo (the district's administrative centre) by road. Turka is the nearest rural locality.

References 

Rural localities in Okinsky District